Neil Midgley may refer to:

 Neil Midgley (referee), English football referee
 Neil Midgley (footballer), English footballer